Vestron Video was the main subsidiary of Vestron, Inc., a home video company based in Stamford, Connecticut, that was active from 1981 to 1993, and is considered to have been a pioneer in the home video market. 

The name is now used for a collector-oriented home entertainment label of Lionsgate.

History 

Vestron was founded in 1981 by Austin Owen Furst Jr. (born 1943), an executive at HBO, who was hired to dismantle the assets of Time-Life Films. Furst bought the video rights of the film library for himself and decided to form a home entertainment company with these assets. Furst's daughter suggested the moniker "Vestron," a portmanteau combining the name of Roman goddess Vesta and "Tron", which means "instrument" in Greek.

The company held on to its Time-Life Video library, and was also responsible for releases on videocassette and CED Videodisc (CED) of mostly B movies and films from the Cannon Films' library. They also distributed films under The Movie Store banner. The most notable titles Vestron released in its early days were Monster Squad and An American Werewolf in London. In later years, the company began to shift towards mainstream films, including films released through their Vestron Pictures subsidiary, most notably Dirty Dancing. Vestron was the first company to release National Geographic and PBS' Nova videos in the late 1980s, mostly distributed by Image Entertainment, and was the first to market with a pro wrestling video, Pro Wrestling Illustrated Presents Lords of the Ring. They also released a 3-volume series called How to Beat Home Video Games, which contains strategies for video games of the time.

They also handled exclusive US distribution, marketing and sales of VidAmerica releases beginning in 1983. Starting in 1985, they handed these duties to their genre sub-label, Lightning Video.

Vestron went public on the New York Stock Exchange in 1985 with what was, at the time, a large market cap initial public offering (IPO) of $440 million, which was oversubscribed. The company enjoyed success for several years, at one point exceeding 10% of the US video movie market. At its high point sales approximated $350 million annually, and the company sold video movies in over 30 countries either directly or through sub-licensing agreements. This was a rights business, built by people who saw the value in video (VCR) rights to films before the major studios did. Eventually they recognized the market potential and film products became increasingly harder for Vestron to acquire. Also, independent producers increased the price of what was available.

Individual licensing agreements
In 1983, Vestron signed an agreement to license several of the films from Sherwood Productions for U.S. and Canadian video distribution. Also that year, Vestron signed a deal to pick up several feature films from Artists Releasing Corporation, namely Vigilante and The House on Sorority Row. In 1984, Vestron Video and Empire Pictures entered into a five-title agreement in which Vestron would handle worldwide distribution of five of the motion pictures produced by Empire.

On June 11, 1985, Vestron Video inked an agreement with New Century Entertainment and financer SLM Inc., in which SLM's titles would be distributed on video by Vestron and theatrically by MGM/UA Entertainment Co.. On February 11, 1986, Vestron Video and ABC Video Enterprises set up a joint venture ABC/Vestron, for the home video releases of the Capital Cities/ABC television archives. All home video releases from the pact were compilation releases, and not entire programs originally aired by the network.

On June 18, 1986, the company inked an agreement with Zupnik Enterprises to release five titles on videocassette; the company's predecessor, Zupnik/Curtis Enterprises, once had an agreement with Thorn EMI/HBO Video to distribute films. On June 25, 1986, the company also inked an agreement with film producer and distributor Hemdale Film Corporation, in which Vestron would obtain home video rights to the Hemdale film library, for the North American region, such as Platoon. This was an extension of the previous licensing agreement that saw the company to release films like Hoosiers and At Close Range.

In 1986, Vestron was rumored to buy independent film distributor Producers Sales Organization, but the deal collapsed, and PSO was shut down outright, forced into bankruptcy, and subsequently renamed Producers Distribution International, then Interaccess Film Distribution, which, on October 8, 1986, became a studio-controlled the foreign sales firm that was controlled by the studio, reflecting the company's commitment to provide an international network of distributors, with access of quality, independently produced product.

The company would then drop its PDO tag, forcing the company to make several deals, and the predecessor Producers Sales Organization, would have output deals with Zupnik Enterprises, Taft-Barish Productions, and a picture-by-picture agreement with RKO Pictures. Films from these agreements would not all flow into Interaccess that easily; the staff decided that the rights to those films would revert to the film's producers, and the company would be free to renegotiate the output deals or producers in order to take their business elsewhere. The deal represents the first three titles delivered by PSO after the agreement was signed, such as The Princess Bride, and two RKO productions Hamburger Hill and Hot Pursuit, and a remake of the 1956 film And God Created Woman.

On October 15, 1986, Vestron Video International signed independent deals with Italian video distributor Domovideo and Korean video distributor Oasis Video Productions. These deals covered 35 titles that would came from the Vestron catalog, including upcoming theatrical features. 

In March 1987, Vestron Video and Granada Television, the UK ITV franchisee holder, inked an agreement to release titles from its back catalog in its exclusive licensing deal into the buoyant of the UK sell-through market. This deal included serials The Jewel in the Crown and Brideshead Revisited, together with special compilations from Granada's own ITV franchisee programme Coronation Street. The company thus had the world record of largest catalog of the time with a single license covering 26 titles plus 12 further titles.

On June 3, 1987, the Vestron Video-Hemdale Film Corporation lawsuit was challenged by a rival home video distributor Nelson Entertainment. Nelson filed the countersuit because it has the same rights to the 12 Hemdale pictures under almost identical terms as the arrangement Vestron attempted to be enforce, and the deal decided to add High Tide in that deal by extension. In July 1987, Vestron Inc. exercised an option to purchase a Cincinnati-area video store chain called The Video Store, which consisted of 10 stores, with owner Jack Messer giving the company another 14 during the July–October period. That year, in August 1987, Vestron promoted Michael Karaffa to sales vice president and Adam Platnick to business affairs vice president, while the company also saw more layoffs, including those of former executives, namely Raymond Bernstein and Gordon Bossin, who both had layoffs in May.

Later years
On October 1, 1986, Vestron Video revamped their internal structure on non-theatricals, promoting the head of the Children's Video Library label, C.J. Kettler, to film acquisition vice president, and shifting the existing operations of Children's Video Library to supervisor Michael Wiese, who subsequently ran a new non-theatrical programming unit as vice president of the studio. Kettler would manage the Vestron team of buyers and manage contracts, and head the feature film acquisition effort. On November 26, 1986, Vestron rejected a takeover bid from the magazine publisher National Lampoon, which the company tried to purchase earlier that year.

The company started to make its own films (Dirty Dancing, Earth Girls Are Easy, Blue Steel), but when the market's preferences matured, and shifted from watching almost any film to just watching "A" titles, which was the majors' specialty, Vestron was already committed to about 20 "B" to low-"A" projects. In 1986, Vestron launched syndicated television distribution unit Vestron Television to syndicate Vestron films to local TV stations.

In 1987, the television unit signed an outsourcing agreement with All American Television to handle syndication of the company's features. That year, Vestron Television International was formed, managed by executives from Interaccess Film Distribution, and Gregory Cascante, president of Interaccess, was named president of Vestron Television International.

In 1987, Vestron Inc. formed a new single unit, the Vestron International Group, with Jon Peisinger as president of the new division, encompassing Interaccess Film Distribution, Vestron Video International, Vestron Pictures International and Locus Video Group. The announcement came after Gregory Cascante has resigned as president of Interaccess Film Distribution, and the operation would have more centralizing Vestron offices in those regions. In late November 1987, Vestron Video revamped their distribution network to get rid of 9 out of 23 distributors and enrolled the 14 in a new "Vestron Advantage" program designed to gave the distributors more incentives and a means to market to sell Vestron tapes more efficiently.

The company had its first top-selling title in 1988 with the hit release of the home video version of the hit Vestron Pictures film Dirty Dancing, a top title retailing for the then-industry-standard price of $89.98, marking the company's first big film to handle sponsorship in excess of Vestron's home video standards. In 1988, it attempted to enter the primetime television market with a television series version of Dirty Dancing for CBS, but the series was cancelled after one season.

The company's financing fell through and it eventually filed for Chapter 11 bankruptcy. On January 11, 1991, it was bought out by Los Angeles-based LIVE Entertainment, a home video and music company, for $27.3 million. LIVE acquired Vestron's extensive (3,000 plus) film library; Vestron executive Kevin Kasha was hired by LIVE to relaunch the label and titles continued to be released under the Vestron name until 1993 under LIVE distribution. The International branches were split up and sold off after the bankruptcy during 1991, the UK branch in particular had been sold a year before to Welsh ITV franchise holder HTV, which renamed it to First Independent Films. Vestron also sold off its TV holdings, including 160 films, TV specials and series to the Paris-based Pandora Group in 1990 and decided to invest their money.

Vestron's international divisions themselves were the second largest after Warner Home Video. Vestron had many direct theatrical, video and TV distribution offices around the world in major markets, and owned a video manufacturing plant in the Netherlands to supply European markets. Today, most of Vestron Video's holdings are owned by Lions Gate Entertainment, which acquired LIVE's forerunner company, Artisan Entertainment, in 2003.

Subsidiaries 
Vestron, Inc.'s subsidiaries included:
 Vestron Video (1981–1993)
 Vestron Pictures (1986–1993)
 Vestron Pictures International (1986–1987)
 Vestron Music Video (1980s)
 Vestron International Group (1986–1991): Overseas distribution unit, formerly entitled Interaccess Film Distribution and Producers Distribution Organization. Many of its staff were hired from Producers Sales Organization after its bankruptcy.
 Vestron Pictures Japan (1987–1990); later ASCII Vestron, Ascii Film and Ascii Visual Entertainment; Japanese subsidiary; now Enterbrain.
 Vestron Television (1986–1990): Former syndicated television unit, whose most notable production was a television series based on Dirty Dancing.
 Vestron Video International (1982–1991)
 Children's Video Library (1983–1987): Children's/family video sub-label.
 Lightning Video (1985–1990): genre sub-label.
 Lightning Pictures (1987–1989)
 Lightning Video International (1985–1990)

Vestron Video Collector's Series 
On August 1, 2016, Lionsgate Home Entertainment announced its revival of the Vestron Video brand as a Blu-ray and DVD reissue label for Vestron and other Lionsgate-owned horror films, similar to boutique labels like Scream Factory and Blue Underground. This line, dubbed the Vestron Video Collector's Series, is branded with an updated version of the first Vestron Video logo from 1982 to 1986 and began with Blu-ray releases of the cult films Chopping Mall (an outside theatrical release) and Blood Diner (released by Lightning Pictures) on September 27, 2016.

Releases

References 

American companies established in 1981
Companies based in Stamford, Connecticut
Mass media companies disestablished in 1993
Defunct companies based in Connecticut
Home video companies of the United States
Lionsgate subsidiaries
Mass media companies established in 1981
Home video companies established in 1981
1993 disestablishments in Connecticut
1981 establishments in Connecticut
1991 mergers and acquisitions